The Type 22 frigate also known as the Broadsword class was a class of frigates built for the British Royal Navy. Fourteen were built in total, with production divided into three batches.

Initially intended to be anti-submarine warfare frigates as part of NATO contribution, the ships became general purpose warships.

HMS Cornwall was the last Royal Navy Type 22 frigate, retired from service on 30 June 2011.

Five Type 22s were scrapped and two more were sunk as targets. The seven other vessels were sold to the Brazilian, Romanian and Chilean navies; five of these remain in service, one was sunk as a target and one sold for scrap.

Ship naming

Broadsword, Boxer
It was originally envisaged that all Type 22s would have names beginning with 'B' (Broadsword, etc.), following the 'A' names used for Type 21 frigates (Amazon, etc.). This changed after the Falklands War when two replacement ships were ordered for the destroyers sunk (Sheffield and Coventry) and were named to commemorate them. Another vessel ordered earlier but not yet started, which was to be named Bloodhound was renamed London.

Cornwall
The alphabetical progression was re-established with the Batch 3 ships (Cornwall, etc.) before being temporarily abandoned with the Type 23 class, named after Dukedoms (Norfolk, Lancaster, etc.). The Royal Navy's latest escort class – the Type 45 or Daring class – have re-introduced the alphabetical progression, using destroyer names from the 1930s and 1950s.

The names selected for the four Batch 3 ships were a mixture:  two, Cornwall and Cumberland, revived County-class names previously carried both by First World War-era  armoured cruisers, and by Second World War-era  heavy cruisers.  The other Batch 3s, Chatham and Campbeltown, were Town names, the former reviving a 1911  light cruiser name, and the latter commemorating  famous for participation in the St Nazaire Raid in 1942; the name for HMS Chatham was selected as a salute to the Medway town, where the Chatham Dockyard, established in 1570, had closed in 1984.

Design
The Type 22 was designed to be a specialist anti-submarine warfare vessel as part of the Royal Navy's contribution to NATO. During Royal Navy service the ships evolved into general purpose frigates with weapons for use against other surface ships, aircraft and submarines. They were built in three batches giving rise to three sub-classes, the first Broadsword of four ships, the second Boxer of six ships and the third and final, Cornwall of four ships. During their Royal Navy service the ships had enhanced command, control and co-ordination facilities that resulted in their often being used as flagships on deployments.

The four  Broadswords were sold to Brazil in the mid 1990s. In the early 2000s Romania acquired and modernised two of the Batch 2 ships, while a third was purchased by Chile.

Development
Following the cancellation of the aircraft carrier programme CVA-01 in 1966, the Royal Navy undertook a reappraisal of the surface fleet, and concluded that the following five new ship types were required:

 A cruiser-type ship to operate large ASW helicopters (this requirement eventually led to the s);
 A missile-armed frigate as an eventual successor to the Type 12 Leander class (this requirement led to the Type 22);
 A cheap patrol frigate (this requirement led to the Type 21); and

Of these, the air defence destroyer appeared to had been given highest priority, the imperative being to get Sea Dart to sea in numbers to replace the air defence capability which would be lost with the retirement of the carrier fleet.

Due to the workload of the Admiralty design department in the 1960s, a private design (Type 21) was purchased as an interim stop-gap whilst the Type 22 was under development. The design process, already hampered by the priority given to the Type 21 and the urgently needed Type 42, was further protracted by attempts to produce a common Anglo-Dutch design. The first Type 22 order was placed in 1972 with Yarrow Shipbuilders; Yarrow undertook much of the detailed design work whilst overall responsibility remained with the Ship Department at Bath.

Batch 1
The length of the first four Type 22s was dictated by the dimensions of the undercover Frigate Refit Complex at Devonport Dockyard. The ships would be powered by a combination of Olympus and Tyne gas turbines in a COGOG (combined gas turbine or gas turbine) arrangement. Machinery spaces were sited as far aft as possible to minimise shaft lengths. The after configuration was dictated by the requirement for a large hangar and a full-width flight deck. Electrical power was provided by GEC generators powered by four Paxman Ventura 16YJCAZ diesel engines, each rated at 1MW.

Weapons fit was determined by the primary ASW role combined with a perceived need for a general purpose capability. The principal ASW weapons systems were the ship's Westland Lynx helicopter and triple torpedo tubes (STWS), with the large Type 2016 sonar a key part of the sensor fit. Air defence was provided in the form of two 'six-pack' launchers for the Seawolf (GWS 25) point-defence missile system. Surface warfare requirements were met by the provision of four Exocet missile launchers, the standard RN fit at that time. A pair of 40 mm L/60 Bofors were fitted in the first batch for patrolling and "junk-busting" on summer Indian Ocean deployments, but proved an impediment in the Falklands War where Type 22 captains considered they interfered with concentrating on the Seawolf setup.

The Broadsword design was unique to the Royal Navy in lacking a main gun armament. Although some of the Leander-class frigates had lost their main gun armament during upgrades,  was the first to be designed from the beginning without a large-calibre gun turret.

Ordering of Type 22s proceeded slowly, in part because of the comparatively high unit cost of the ships. The unit cost of the last Type 12Ms had been about £10m; Type 21s cost around £20m each; when the first Type 22s were ordered, unit costs were estimated at £30m though, by the time that the first ship (Broadsword) commissioned in 1979, inflation had driven this figure up to £68m, which was far higher than the cost of the contemporary Type 42s (also commissioned in 1979, cost £40m).

Batch 2
After the first four ("Batch I") ships, the design was "stretched", with the Frigate Refit Complex suitably enlarged. Visually, and in addition to the increase in length, the biggest difference was the sharply raked stem, usually indicative of bow sonar though none of the Batch II ships was thus fitted. An important addition to the Batch II group was a new computer assisted command system (CACS-1), replacing the CAAIS fitted to the Batch I ships. This could track up to 500 targets, including those detected by the ships' new Type 2031Z passive towed array sonar and ESM The most significant change in this group of six Type 22 frigates is much more sophisticated electronic warfare systems, particularly the Classic Outboard system for the intercept of Soviet naval and submarine communications. This very sophisticated and specialised versions of the Type 22 were specifically approved by the Prime Minister James Callaghan. The larger hull also improved sea keeping, but never achieved the expected quietness with towed arrays due to failure to raft mount the diesel generators. This would be important in operations in the Greenland-Iceland-UK gap where the ships were expected to play an important role in preventing and monitoring the passage of Soviet naval units at a critical stage of the Cold War. A revised machinery installation was adopted from  onwards, with Rolls-Royce Spey turbines replacing the previous Rolls-Royce Olympus. The future machinery arrangement would be Combined Gas turbine And Gas turbine (COGAG). Further improvements from HMS Brave onwards included a taller helicopter hangar, giving the ships the ability to carry a single Westland Sea King or EH101 Merlin instead of two Lynx. By 1982, the quoted unit cost of a Type 22 had risen to £127m.

Broadsword and Brilliant participated in the Falklands War and replacements for the ships lost in the South Atlantic were all Type 22s.

Batch 3
 
The four Batch III ships – Cornwall, Cumberland, Campbeltown and Chatham – were completed to a revised design which reflected lessons learned in the Falklands War. The weapons fit was changed, becoming more optimised for a general warfare role. The only major weapon systems shared with the previous vessels were the pair of six-cell Seawolf launchers and the torpedo tubes. The ships were fitted with a 4.5-inch (113 mm) Mk.8 gun, primarily to provide naval gunfire support for forces on land. Exocet was replaced by the superior Harpoon with eight GWS 60 missile launchers fitted laterally abaft the bridge, and each ship carried a 30 mm Goalkeeper CIWS to provide last-ditch defence against anti-ship missiles.

Electrical power in Batch 3 ships is provided by Paxman Valenta 12RPA200 diesel engines, replacing the Ventura engines used on earlier ships.

In their final form, the Type 22s were the largest frigates built to date for the Royal Navy. Reflecting this, Type 22s were often deployed as flagships for NATO Task Groups.

Specifications

Construction and running costs

Construction programme

On 11 January 1985, Mr. Dalyell asked the Secretary of State for Defence: "what is the latest cost estimate of a type 22 frigate, with stores, spare parts and ammunition." The Secretary of State for Defence, Mr. Lee, replied: "The average cost of a batch III type 22 frigate is currently estimated at about £140 million at 1984–85 prices. The cost of embarked helicopters, the first outfit of stores, spare parts and ammunition are estimated at about £18 million at the same price level."

Running costs

Availability

In February 1998, in response to a written question in parliament by Mike Hancock, the Minister of State for the Armed Forces, Dr John Reid said: "Type 22 frigates achieved approximately 82 to 86 per cent. average availability for operational service in each of the last five years. This discounts time spent in planned maintenance."

Ships – disposal and current state

In May 2000, the Secretary of State for Defence was asked the planned service life of London, Beaver,  Boxer, and  Brave and the forecast date for withdrawal from Royal Navy service, "prior to the decision in the Strategic Defence Review to dispose of them."  The Minister of State for the Armed Forces, John Spellar, replied in a written answer: "The planned service for each ship was 18 years" and The additional information is given in the table." Note that the 18 years was dated from the date of acceptance, not the date first commissioned.

In July 2000, the Secretary of State for Defence was asked when he planned to withdraw the remaining Type 22 Batch II frigates from service.  The Minister of State for the Armed Forces, John Spellar, replied that HMS Sheffield would be withdrawn in 2012 and superseded by a Type 45 destroyer, Coventry in 2001 superseded by HMS St. Albans, a Type 23 frigate

See also
 List of naval ship classes in service

Notes

Footnotes

Bibliography

Frigate classes
Ship classes of the Royal Navy